Ali-Mohammad Mirza, whose royal title was Ehtesham-ol-Mamalek, was the third son of Khanlar Mirza, known as Ehteshami ed-Dowleh, the commander of Nasser al-Din Shah's forces in Bushehr during the Anglo-Persian War, and the grandson of Abbas Mirza.

Ali-Mohammad Mirza was given a royal Neshan by Mozaffar al-Din Shah Qajar of 'Sardar 2nd class'.

Sons
 Mohammad Reza Mirza (royal title: Badi-ol-Mamalek)
 Husain Gohli Mirza (royal title: Ehteshami-Nezham)
 Mohammad Mirza (royal title: Aleh-Soltan)
 Mohammad Vali Mirza (royal title: Ehteshami-ed-Dowleh II)

Qajar princes